BBC Weather is the department of the BBC (British Broadcasting Corporation) responsible for both the preparation and the broadcasting of weather forecasts.

On 6 February 2018, BBC Weather changed supplier from the government Met Office to MeteoGroup, after being required to put its weather services out to tender. Previously, the government Met Office had been the provider of weather information for 94 years.

History

The first BBC weather forecast was a shipping forecast, broadcast on the radio on behalf of the Met Office on 14 November 1922, and the first daily weather forecast was broadcast on 26 March 1923.

In 1936, the BBC experimented with the world's first televised weather maps, brought into practice in 1949 after World War II. The map filled the entire screen, with an off-screen announcer reading the next day's weather.

Advancement of technology
On 11 January 1954, the first in-vision weather forecast was broadcast, presented by George Cowling. In an in-vision the narrator stands in front of the map. At that point, the maps were drawn by hand in the London Weather Centre, before being couriered across London. The forecasts were presented by the same person who had composed them, and had relatively low accuracy. The London Weather Centre which opened in 1959 took the responsibility for the national radio weather broadcasts. Radio forecasters were chosen by a BBC audition from the forecasters at the London Weather Centre.

In 1962, the installation of a fax machine and an electronic computer in the Met Office led to more accurate and quicker forecasting.

Satellite photography was available from 1964, but was of a poor quality and was given on paper, with the coastline etched in felt-tip pen. This did not change until 1973 with the installation of a new computer, increasing processing power of the Weather Centre greatly, leading to forecasts twice as accurate as earlier ones.

Graphical technology

As computational capability improved, so did graphics technology. Early hand-drawn maps gave way to magnetic symbols, which in turn gave way to bluescreen (CSO) computer-generated imagery technology, each of which allowed the presenter greater control over the information displayed.

Early magnetic symbols tended to adhere poorly to the maps, and occasional spelling errors (such as the presenter writing 'GOF' instead of 'FOG') marred some broadcasts, but allowed the presenter to show how weather would change over time. The symbols were designed to be 'self-explicit', allowing the viewer to understand the map without a key or legend.

On 18 February 1985, computer graphics were introduced although the basic design of symbols was kept the same. These forecasts were widely acclaimed for their simplicity, winning an award from the Royal Television Society in 1993.

On 2 October 2000, BBC Weather underwent a more significant change. Whilst there was not much change to the existing weather symbols new symbols giving information on pollen and sun levels were introduced. A new more detailed map of Britain was used based on satellite data.

Great Storm of 1987 controversy
Possibly the most famous of the forecasters is the now semi-retired Michael Fish. Famous for his informal manner and eccentric dress sense (he once wore a blue and green blazer emblazoned with all the weather symbols), he was a viewer favourite despite an unfortunate comment before the Great Storm of 1987.

During a weather forecast some hours before the storm, Michael Fish started his forecast with the now infamous line "Earlier on today, apparently, a woman rang the BBC and said she heard there was a hurricane on the way. Well, if you're watching, don't worry, there isn't". In this he was factually correct, as it is impossible for a proper hurricane to reach the UK latitudes, and he was actually referring to a Florida hurricane (Floyd). He then went on to accurately forecast stormy conditions over the south of England. However, the statement has gone down in popular culture as one of the worst mistakes made so publicly.

Weatherscape XT Graphics (2005–2018)

The weather symbols were replaced in May 2005 after 29 years and 9 months on air by a controversial format as the forecast underwent another redesign, with the flat map replaced by a 3D globe, and weather conditions shown by coloured areas. Cloud cover is indicated by the brightness of the map, while rain and snow are indicated by animated blue and white areas respectively. The graphics are provided by Weatherscape XT, which was developed by the commercial arm of the New Zealand Metservice.

The move polarised opinion; some saw it as more accurate and modern, while others disliked the brown colour chosen for the landmass and the presumed high cost of the graphics. The angling of the map, in order to show the curvature of the Earth, led to Scotland appearing little larger than Devon, and Shetland being almost invisible while exaggerating London and the South East. This led to many Scottish commentators accusing the BBC of having a London bias. As a result, the map was realigned, and the moving tour of the UK was lengthened.

The new look won a prestigious Silver Award at the Promax/BDA Awards in 2006. Criticism has continued, however, with some viewers complaining about the colour scheme, and of a lack of detail in the forecast about weather developments beyond 36 hours. There have been continuous developments. In 2006, a rippling effect was introduced to define seas and oceans.

BBC Weather Service switch to MeteoGroup

On 23 August 2015, the BBC announced that the Met Office would lose its contract to provide weather forecasts, the BBC stating that it is legally obliged to ensure that licence fee payers get the best value for money. The BBC said that the on-air presenting team was not expected to change and it would still broadcast warnings from the Met Office National Severe Weather Warning Service and Shipping Forecast issued on behalf of the Maritime and Coastguard Agency.

A competitive tendering process followed, with MeteoGroup chosen as the new provider in August 2016. On 6 February 2018, the BBC began using the MeteoGroup graphics, which include:
 a seasonal "window on the weather" at the start of each bulletin
 green land
 high quality moving graphics reproduce detailed weather conditions represented by high-resolution data
 more "realistic mapping"
 a "realistic globe" to display a "variety of data from falling snow particles to areas likely to see the aurora"
 forecasts that offer "improved accessibility for users with colour-blindness"
 the possibility to "customise both TV and online forecasts, zooming in on particular areas to provide a more detailed forecast"
 a 'chance of precipitation' feature on the app
 a 'feels like' factor, for the app, that determines how cold it feels outside, particularly in different wind conditions
 up to a 7-day forecast on TV and radio
 up to 14 days of hourly forecasts for more UK and international locations—online and on the app
Public feedback in January 2018 regarding the subsequent updates and changes to the BBC Website and associated weather applications for mobile devices were generally critical. 
Many weather watchers were highly critical of the new design, with widespread criticism voiced across the media. Many used the comments section of the blog written by Michael Burnett, the BBC Executive responsible, to voice their complaints. The blog entry dated 22 January 2018 was originally aimed at positively promoting the changes, but this appeared to have the opposite effect when the blog post generated well over 1000 mostly critical comments in under 10 days.

National forecasters
National forecasters still provide forecasts for local news programmes.

Current

 Philip Avery
 Darren Bett
 Stav Danaos
 Chris Fawkes
 Alina Jenkins
 Sarah Keith-Lucas
 Simon King
 Carol Kirkwood
 Louise Lear
 Lucy Martin
 Nick Miller
 Susan Powell
 Ben Rich
 Tomasz Schafernaker
 Matt Taylor
 Helen Willetts
 Owain Wyn Evans

Former

 Jack Armstrong
 Jim Bacon
 Bill Bruce
 Suzanne Charlton
 T. H. Clifton 
 Peter Cockroft
 Daniel Corbett
 George Cowling
 Bernard Davey
 Alex Deakin
 Liam Dutton
 Richard Edgar
 Barbara Edwards
 Michael Fish
 Bert Foord 
 Everton Fox
 Peter Gibbs
 Bill Giles
 John Hammond
 John Kettley
 Isobel Lang
 Tori Lacey
 David Lee
 Kirsty McCabe
 Ian McCaskill
 Rob McElwee
 Graham Parker
 Anne Purvis
 Nina Ridge
 Jack Scott
 Laura Tobin
 Penny Tranter
 Sarah Wilmshurst
 Francis Wilson
 Jay Wynne
 Helen Young

Online forecasts
The BBC Weather website provides outlook weather forecasts for UK and international locations using animated symbols and a format similar in design to that used for the televised broadcasts. The website launched in 1997.

The website also runs frequent special features about seasonal sports, white Christmas, nature, and meteorological science. It also has world weather, UK outlook, and weather news.

BBC Weather apps
On 20 May 2013, the BBC released the BBC Weather App for both iOS devices (although initially not optimised for iPad) and Android devices (via the Google Play Store). Both versions were designed by Media Applications Technologies, and their data source was the Met Office.

See also

National, regional, and retired BBC weather forecasters

References

Further reading
 Hunt, Roger, "The end of weather forecasting at Met Office London", Weather magazine, Royal Meteorological Society, June 2007, v.62, no.6, pp. 143–146

External links

BBC
Television news in the United Kingdom
Weather television